The Daily Ledger News was a newspaper founded in the Bay Area March 26, 1870, in The Bay Area, Oakland, California. The newspaper's last edition was December 31, 2012.

References

Daily newspapers published in the San Francisco Bay Area
Antioch, California
1870 establishments in California
2012 disestablishments in California